Theater Saarbrücken, officially Saarländisches Staatstheater since 1971, is the state theatre of Saarland in its capital Saarbrücken, Germany. It has several divisions (opera, drama, dance, concert) and offers annually around 30 new productions in around 700 events for more than 200,000 people. Its venues are Großes Haus (Big House), Alte Feuerwache (Old Fire Station), Congresshalle (Conference Hall) and sparte4 (area 4). While theatre in Saarbrücken has a long history, the present main venue was completed in 1938, with plans commissioned by the Nazi regime.

History 
Saarbrücken had several venues for theatre before the French Revolution, a theatre at the Schloss Saarbrücken, a comedy house from 1787, and an open-air theatre on the Ludwigsberg. August Wilhelm Iffland was director of the court theatres from 1786 to 1793. 

During the following period as part of Prussia, there was no venue for theatre. In 1897, the Saalbau was built as a concert hall. A municipal theatre was built by Hans Peter Weszkalnys and opened on 18 February 1897 with the opera Mignon by Ambroise Thomas. From 1899, it was called Thalia-Theater. In 1906, plans for a better building began. 

The funding came mostly from the city of Saarbrücken. It was opened on 9 October 1938, called Gautheater Saarpfalz, with a performance of Wagner's Der fliegende Holländer, in the presence of Hitler, Goebbels and Heinrich Himmler. Heinz Bongartz was GMD from 1937 and 1944.

Destroyed in World War II, the theatre was restored, and opened again on 6 March 1948, now named Stadttheater Saarbrücken (Saarbrücken City Theatre), with Mozart's Die Zauberflöte. When the Saar became part of the Federal Republic of Germany on 1 January 1957, the contract was signed at the theatre, with chancellor Konrad Adenauer and the prime minister of the Saar, Hubert Ney.

In 1971, the state of Saarland took over as owner of the theatre, and the name was changed to Saarländisches Staatstheater. The building was declared a historic monument in 1983.  has been the Intendant from the 2017/18 season.

People 
Among the people holding the position of Intendant (General manager) were:
 Hermann Wedekind (1960–1975)
 Martin Peleikis (1975–1991)
  (1991–2006)
  (2006–2017)
  (from 2017)

Literature 
 Paul Baumgarten: Neue Theaterbauten in Saarbrücken und Berlin. in: Die Kunst im Dritten Reich. Munich 1938, pp. 94–111 und S. 117–124.
 Marlen Dittmann: Die Baukultur im Saarland 1904–1945. Institut für Landeskunde im Saarland (Saarland-Hefte 3), Saarbrücken 2004, pp. 65–68.
 Festschrift Gautheater Saarpfalz Saarbrücken. 9. Oktober 1938, Sonderheft der 'Blätter des Gautheaters Saarpfalz', hrsg. vom Intendant des Gautheaters Saarpfalz, Saarbrücken 1938.
 Paul Peters: Saarländisches Staatstheater. Ministerium für Kultus, Bildung und Wissenschaft des Saarlandes und dem Saarländischen Staatstheater, Saarbrücken 1989 (Festschrift zur Wiedereröffnung des Großen Hauses des Saarländischen Staatstheaters, 29/30 April 1989).
 100 Jahre Saarländisches Staatsorchester. Saarländischen Staatstheater, Saarbrücken 2012.
 Dagmar Schlingmann und Harald Müller (Hrsg.): Grenzenlos, 75 Jahre Saarländisches Staatstheater. Berlin 2013, .
 Hildegard Schorr: Die Geschichte des Saarbrücker Theaters von den Anfängen bis zur Gegenwart. Dissertation, Mainz 1952.

See also 
List of productions of Swan Lake derived from its 1895 revival

References

External links 

 
 
 sparte4
 Primeurs-Festivals für frankophone Gegenwartsdramatik
 Tanzfestival Saar
 Literature on Saarländische Bibliographie

Nazi architecture
Theatres in Germany
1938 architecture
Buildings and structures in Saarbrücken